Lahu Ka Lagaan was a social media campaign by She Says India, a non-profit organisation, to remove the 12% taxation on sanitary napkins in India to make sanitary napkins tax-exempt. Lahu Ka Lagaan translates to 'the tax on blood' from Hindi. The campaign was launched in April 2017, following the release of the Goods and Services Tax (GST) rates being rolled out by the Indian government, that placed sanitary napkins at the second lowest tax slab of 12%. The campaign received widespread attention, when celebrities like Mallika Dua, Cyrus Broacha, Vishal Dadlani and Aditi Rao Hydari used their social media influence to voice their support for the campaign, and asked the Indian finance minister Arun Jaitley to make sanitary napkins to be made tax-free.

The primary objective of the campaign, besides the tax exemption on sanitary napkins, was to ensure the implementation of governmental schemes of providing low-cost pads and vending machines for the dispensation of sanitary pads, affecting girls' access to education and livelihoods.

Context 
The context of the campaign lay in the unavailability and lack of affordability of sanitary napkins in India. India has roughly 355 million people (girls/women) who menstruate. Out of these, almost 70% cannot afford sanitary napkins. The lack of affordable sanitary napkins, and the subsequent use of unhygienic alternatives like dirty fabric, sand, wood shavings or dry leaves, increases women's vulnerability to reproductive tract infections by 70%.

In response to the widespread criticism against the tax, the government declared sanitary napkins tax-exempt on July 22, 2018, a move that was hailed as a victory for the Lahu Ka Lagaan campaign.

However, some financial experts opined that the cutting 12% GST on sanitary napkins might actually make them more costly, as manufacturers would still have to pay individual tax on the raw materials needed for production, thus driving up prices.

References

Social movements
Social movements in India
Feminist movements and ideologies
Women's health
Social media campaigns